Queen Catherine may refer to:

Catherine Sunesdotter (died 1252), wife of Eric "XI" of Sweden
Catherine of Lancaster (1372–1418), wife of Henry III of Castile
Catherine of Valois (1401–1437), wife of Henry V of England
Catherine Karlsdotter (died 1450), wife of Carl II of Sweden and Norway
Catherine of Bosnia (1425–1478), wife of Stephen Thomas of Bosnia
Catherine of Poděbrady (1449–1464), wife of Matthias Corvinus of Hungary
Catherine of Aragon (1485–1536), first wife of Henry VIII of England
Catherine of Saxe-Lauenburg (1513–1535), first wife of Gustav I of Sweden
Catherine of Austria, Queen of Portugal (1507–1578), wife of John III of Portugal
Catherine Parr (1512–1548), sixth and last wife of Henry VIII of England
Catherine de' Medici (1519–1589), wife of Henry II of France
Catherine Howard (c.1523–1542), fifth wife of Henry VIII of England
Catherine Stenbock (1535–1621), third wife of Gustav I of Sweden
Catherine of Austria, Queen of Poland (1533–1572), third wife of Sigismund II Augustus of Poland
Catherine Jagiellon (1526–1583), wife of John III of Sweden
Catherine Månsdotter (1550–1612), wife of Eric XIV of Sweden
Ketevan the Martyr (1565–1624), wife of David I of Kakheti and Saint of the Georgian Orthodox Church
Anne Catherine of Brandenburg (1575–1612), wife of Christian IV of Denmark
Catherine of Braganza (1638–1705), wife of Charles II of England
Catharine Montour (1710–1804), prominent Iroquois woman
Catherine of Navarre (1468–1517), queen regnant of Navarre

See also 
Queen Catherine Ironfist, the fictional protagonist of the computer game Heroes of Might and Magic III
Catherine the Great